Nicholas Brown (died 1726, first name also Nicolas) was an English pirate who was active off the coast of Jamaica during the early 18th century.

History

Brown was among a large group of pirates who accepted the 1717-1718 pardon offered to pirates by King George. Like several others, he soon returned to piracy, surrendering to the Spanish on Cuba before sailing in their service out of Trinidad. Governor Nicholas Laws of Jamaica wrote to Spanish magistrates in Trinidad in 1722 demanding “Satisfaction of you for so many notorious Robberies which your People have lately committed on the King's Subjects of this Island; particularly by those Traytors, Nicolas Brown and Christopher Winter, to whom you have given Protection.”

In 1723 he captured an English ship near Hispaniola with over 300 slaves aboard. He set the captain and crew adrift and brought the ship to Baracoa, Cuba. Brown paid another sailor to pretend to be the ship's captain so he could have Spanish officials in Baracoa condemn and sell the ship and slaves as a lawful prize.

He was finally caught and defeated in battle by pirate hunter and former schoolmate John Drudge in November 1726, dying of wounds sustained in the fight. Drudge had Brown's body decapitated and his head pickled in rum so he could collect the reward of £500 offered by the Jamaican government.

See also
John Auger

Notes

References

18th-century pirates
Year of birth missing
British pirates
People executed for piracy
1726 deaths
Caribbean pirates